Charops is a genus of parasitoid wasps belonging to the family Ichneumonidae.

The genus has cosmopolitan distribution.

Species:
 Charops aditya Gupta & Maheshwary, 1971
 Charops angelicae Santos, Onody & Brandão, 2019

References

Ichneumonidae
Ichneumonidae genera